Alawattegama is a village in Sri Lanka. It is located within Kandy District, Central Province.

History
Archibald Campbell Lawrie describes the village in his 1896 gazetteer as a "Duraya" village, with inhabitants of "Panna Durayo" (grass cutters).

Demographics

See also
List of towns in Central Province, Sri Lanka

References

External links

Populated places in Kandy District